Macaranga puncticulata is a tree in the family Euphorbiaceae. It is endemic to the tropical peat swamp forests of South East Asia.

References

puncticulata